Elekta is a global Swedish company that develops and produces radiation therapy and radiosurgery-related equipment and clinical management for the treatment of cancer and brain disorders. Elekta has a global presence in more than 120 countries, with over 40 offices around the world and about 4,700 employees.

History
Elekta was jointly founded in 1972 by the late Lars Leksell, Professor of Neurosurgery at the Karolinska Institute in Stockholm, Sweden, and his son Laurent (Larry) Leksell, in order to commercialize the development of the Leksell Stereotactic System, and Gamma Knife, which he had been researching since the late 1940s.

Since 1994, the company has been listed on the Nordic Exchange (Nasdaq Stockholm) under the ticker EKTAb.  Larry Leksell became Chief Executive Officer of Elekta until 2005, and under his leadership the company expanded into a public medical technology group with more than 3,400 employees worldwide. Larry Leksell remains the Chairman of the Board of Elekta. The role of President and CEO has been held by the following:

 Tomas Puusepp: May 2005 to May 2014
 Niklas Savander: May 2014 to May 2015
 Tomas Puusepp: May 2015 to June 2016
 Richard Hausmann: June 2016 until June 2020
 Gustaf Salford: June–November 2020 (as Acting President and CEO); November 2020 - today

Acquired companies 
Elekta has acquired companies within the industry as well as distributors and service providers. Some of these include: Philips Medical Systems radiotherapy division, IMPAC Medical Systems, Inc., Beijing Medical Equipment Institute (BMEI), 3D Line Medical Systems, CMS, Inc., Nucletron, ProKnow Systems, LLC, Kaiku Health.

Products 
Elekta produces a wide range of devices used in stereotactic radiosurgery, a noninvasive procedure used to treat brain disorders such as tumors, arteriovenous malformation (AVM), and some functional diseases. These devices include:

Neurosurgery products 
Neurosurgery products, such as the Leksell Stereotactic System, an arc-based stereotactic frame, based on a polar coordinate system, that is fixed to the patient's head when performing minimally invasive stereotactic neurosurgery procedures.

Leksell Gamma Knife, used to treat brain tumors by administering high intensity gamma radiation therapy in a manner that concentrates the radiation over a small volume. The original device was invented in 1967 at the Karolinska Institute in Stockholm, Sweden by Lars Leksell, Romanian-born neurosurgeon Ladislau Steiner, and radiobiologist Börje Larsson from Uppsala University, Sweden. The first Gamma Knife was brought to the United States through an arrangement between US neurosurgeon Robert Wheeler Rand and Leksell and was given to the University of California, Los Angeles (UCLA) in 1979. Today there are more than 330 Leksell Gamma Knife systems installed and used globally.

Linear accelerators 
Elekta also produces linear accelerators (linacs) used for external beam radiotherapy (EBRT), the most common form of radiotherapy (radiation therapy). Some of Elekta’s linacs include:

 Versa HD linear accelerator (linac), launched in 2013.
 Elekta Unity MR-Linac, the first high field (1.5 Tesla) MR-Linac combines magnetic resonance imaging with a radiation therapy (MR/RT) system (linear accelerator). It was developed together with UMC Utrecht and Philips and launched in 2018.
 Harmony linear accelerator, launched in 2020.

Brachytherapy devices 
Through the acquisition of Nucletron in 2011, Elekta became the global market leader in brachytherapy devices. These include:

 Flexitron afterloader, which delivers the planned radiation dose to the treatment area.
 Applicators (Geneva [6] and Venezia [7]) for cervical cancer patients.
 Oncentra Brachy treatment planning software.
 ImagingRing, a mobile CT scanner

Software 

 MOSAIQ oncology information system (OIS) for oncology workflow and information management.
 Monaco treatment planning system.

During its 50 years, Elekta has developed and marketed dozens of new products, and owns thousands of patents for neurosurgical and radiation therapy-related technologies.

Environmental, Social, and Governance commitment 
Elekta adheres to its Global Environment Policy, striving to manage its environmental impacts throughout the value chain and the life cycle of delivering its products and services, to meet its long-term environmental ambitions and sustainability goals.

Elekta issued the first sustainability-linked bonds in Sweden with a pure social KPI. The funds of SEK 1.5 billion are intended to contribute to increasing the global access of cancer care in underserved markets.

In August 2021, at its Annual General Meeting, Elekta’s shareholders approved the Board of Directors’ proposal to establish the Elekta Foundation. The Elekta Foundation’s mission is an important part of Elekta’s environmental, social, and governance (ESG) strategy and priorities. Its mission is to initiate and support projects and programs in partnership with governments, NGOs and healthcare providers in low- and middle-income countries to improve access to cancer care.[3]

Other relevant documents and links can be found on the Sustainability page of Elekta’s website.

Read more in Elekta’s In-Depth Sustainability Report from July 2022.

References

External links 
 

Technology companies of Sweden
Health care companies of Sweden
Health care companies established in 1972
Swedish brands
Companies based in Stockholm
Companies listed on Nasdaq Stockholm
Swedish companies established in 1972